The Chaetomiaceae (Index Fungorum number: IF80582) are a family of fungi in the Ascomycota, order Sordariales, class Sordariomycetes. Chaetomiaceae are usually saprobic or parasitic. Cheatomiaceae are a great source of enzymes with diverse biotechnological and industrial applications such as PMO (polysaccharide monooxygenase), L-methioninase, β-1,3-glucanase, laccase, dextranase, lipolytic, pectinolytic, amylolytic, chitinolytic, and proteolytic enzymes. The production of such compounds can be taken into account as candidates for the development of effective and novel lead compounds for medicine, biological control and production of bioactive secondary metabolites. Chaetomiaceae furthermore contains some of the most well known thermophilic fungi, an interesting feature carrying many biological applications, but that is found only in few fungal genera.

Genera 

 Achaetomium
 Bommerella
 Boothiella
 Botryotrichum
 Chaetomidium
 Chaetomiopsis
 Chaetomium
 Collariella
 Corynascella
 Corynascus
 Emilmuelleria
 Erythrocarpon
 Farrowia
 Guanomyces
 Setiferotheca
 Subramaniula
 Thielavia
 Trichocladium

References

External links

Sordariales
Ascomycota families